Mykhailo Pylypovych Kravchuk, also Krawtchouk (September 27, 1892 – March 9, 1942), was a Soviet Ukrainian mathematician and the author of around 180 articles on mathematics.

He primarily wrote papers on differential equations and integral equations, studying both their theory and applications. His two-volume monograph on the solution of linear differential and integral equations by the method of moments was translated  1938–1942 by John Vincent Atanasoff who found this work useful in his computer-project (Atanasoff–Berry computer). His student Klavdiya Latysheva was the first Ukrainian woman to obtain a doctorate in the mathematical and physical sciences (1936).

Kravchuk held a mathematics chair at the Kyiv Polytechnic Institute. His course listeners included Sergey Korolev, Arkhip Lyulka, and Vladimir Chelomei, future leading rocket and jet engine designers. Kravchuk was arrested by the Soviet secret police on February 23, 1938 on political and spying charges. He was sentenced to 20 years of prison in September 1938. Kravchuk died in a Gulag camp in the Kolyma region on March 9, 1942. In September 1956 Kravchuk was posthumously acquitted of all charges.

He was restored as a member of the National Academy of Sciences of Ukraine posthumously in 1992. He is the eponym of the Kravchuk polynomials and Kravchuk matrix.

References

External links 
 
MacTutor biography
Biography page(this uses the transliteration Mikhail Krawtchouk, which is phonetic for Francophones, and under which he published work) 
 Ukrainian biographical website
 Krawtchouk Polynomials Home Page 
 I. Katchanovski, Krawtchouk's Mind Biographical article
 Video about Mykhailo Pylypovych Kravchuk 
 S. Hrabovsy, Mykhailo Kravchuk, a mathematician, patriot and precursor of computers, Welcome to Ukraine, 4, 2003
 N. Virchenko, Life and death of Mykhailo Kravchuk, a brilliant mathematician, Welcome to Ukraine, 2, 2008
INTERNATIONAL MATHEMATICAL KRAVCHUK CONFERENCE

Soviet mathematicians
Taras Shevchenko National University of Kyiv alumni
1892 births
1942 deaths
People from Volyn Oblast
People from Volhynian Governorate
Ukrainian people who died in Soviet detention